Tarari is a village and corresponding community development block in Bhojpur district of Bihar, India. As of 2011, its population was 3,586, in 393 households. The total block population was 182,631, in 28,316 households.

Geography 
Tarari, along with the entirety of Tarari block, is located on the Arrah plains.

Demographics 
Tarari is a rural block, with no large urban centres. As of 2011, its sex ratio was 926, which was higher than the Bhojpur district ratio of 907. The sex ratio was higher in the 0-6 age group, with 945 females for every 1000 males, which was also higher than the district value of 918 for this age group. Members of scheduled castes made up 20.15% of the block population and members of scheduled tribes made up 0.11%. The block's literacy rate was 71.04%, which was marginally higher than the district rate of 70.47%. There was a 24.99% gender literacy gap between men (83.03%) and women (58.04%) in Tarari block, which was slightly above the district average of 23.71%.

Most of Tarari block's workforce was employed in agriculture in 2011, with 24.77% being cultivators who owned or leased their own land and another 55.15% being agricultural labourers who worked someone else's land for wages. (The 55.15% of workers being agricultural labourers was the highest proportion in Bhojpur district.) 5.23% were household industry workers, and the remaining 14.85% were other workers. The block's workforce was predominantly male: there were 12,413 male workers and 2,573 female workers in 2011. Higher proportions of men than women were counted as cultivators and agricultural labourers, while greater proportions of women than men worked as household industry workers and other workers.

Villages 
Tarari block contains the following 115 villages:

References 

Villages in Bhojpur district, India